A list of films produced by the Israeli film industry in 1980.

1980 releases

Unknown premiere date

See also
1980 in Israel

References

External links
 Israeli films of 1980 at the Internet Movie Database

Israeli
Film
1980